Van Ingen is a Dutch toponymic surname meaning "from/of Ingen", a town in Gelderland. An archaic spelling is Van Inghen. People with the surname include:

Ferdinand van Ingen (born 1933), Dutch Germanist
Gerrit Jan van Ingen Schenau (1944–1998), Dutch biomechanist, inventor of the clap skate 
Henry Van Ingen (1833–1898) or Hendrik van Ingen, Dutch painter active in the United States
Herb Van Ingen, Jr. (1924–2010), American ice hockey goaltender
Marsilius van Inghen (1330s–1396), Dutch Scholastic philosopher
Willem van Ingen (1651–1708), Dutch painter active in Italy
William B. Van Ingen (1858–1955), American stained glass artist and painter

See also
Van Ingen & Van Ingen, Indian taxidermy company started by Eugene van Ingen (?–1928)
Ingen (disambiguation)

References

Dutch-language surnames
Toponymic surnames